Park Si-eun (born Park Eun-young; January 6, 1980) is a South Korean actress. She played leading roles in the television dramas It Was Love (2012) and Hold My Hand (2013).

Personal life 
In December 2014, Park announced her engagement to her Pure Pumpkin Flower co-star Jin Tae-hyun. The couple married in July 2015.

On February 21, 2022, she announced that she was pregnant with her first child, after previously experiencing two miscarriages. The couple also has an adoptive daughter named Jin Se-yeon. However, on August 20, Jin Tae-hyun announced that Park has suffered an miscarriage 20 days before birth.

Filmography

Television series

Film

Television show

Music video

Theater

Discography

Ambassadorship 
 The 7th Sponsor of the Companion Club  (2022)

Awards and nominations

References

External links
 
 Park Si-eun at PF Entertainment
 
 

1980 births
Living people
South Korean television actresses
South Korean film actresses
South Korean musical theatre actresses
South Korean stage actresses
Dongduk Women's University alumni